Kitutu Chache was a former electoral constituency in Kenya. It was one of four constituencies in the former Kisii District. The constituency was established for the 1988 elections. It has been divided into Kitutu Chache North Constituency and Kitutu Chache South Constituency, both part of Kisii County.

Former foreign minister Zachary Onyonka was a Kitutu Chache MP. Earlier, he had represented the Kitutu West Constituency that was split before the 1988 elections.

Members of Parliament

Wards

References

External links 
Kitutu Chache Constituency

Kisii County
Constituencies in Nyanza Province
1988 establishments in Kenya
Constituencies established in 1988
Former constituencies of Kenya